The 2017 World of Outlaws Craftsman Sprint Car Series season is the 39th season of the winged sprint car series in North America. The season began with the DIRTcar Nationals at Volusia Speedway Park on February 17, and will end with the World of Outlaws World Finals at The Dirt Track at Charlotte Motor Speedway on November 4. Donny Schatz entered the 2017 season as the defending series champion. Schatz won the series championship for the 9th time in 2017.

Teams & Drivers

Complete Schedule

Schedule

 - ≠ will state if the race was postponed or canceled
 - ≈ will state if the race is not for championship points

Schedule notes and changes
 - the February 18th race at Volusia Speedway Park was postponed to February 19 due to weather 
 - the March 4th race at Gator Motorplex was postponed to April 14 due to weather 
 - the March 24th race at Stockton Dirt Track was canceled due to weather 
 - the April 21st race at Riverside International Speedway was postponed to May 3 due to weather 
 - the April 22nd race at Federated Auto Parts Raceway at I-55 was canceled due to weather 
 - the Outlaw Fanfest (July 1 & July 2) at Badlands Motor Speedway was canceled. Dakota State Fair Speedway ran on the July 1st date in its place.  
 - the Duel in the Dakotas (June 17) race at Red River Valley Speedway was postponed until August 19.
 - the Clash at the Creek (June 29) race at Deer Creek Speedway was postponed until July 6.
 - Empire State Challenge race at Weedsport Speedway was canceled after having rain outs on both slated race dates (May 21 and October 15)
 - the Champion Racing Oil Summer Nationals (July 22) race at Williams Grove Speedway was postponed until September 28, making night #1 of the Champion Racing Oil National Open a 2 feature event.
 - the Big "R" Outlaw Showdown (July 23) race at Ransomville Speedway was postponed until October 16.
 - the Ironman 55 race at Federated Auto Parts Raceway at I-55 was postponed to the 2018 season.

Results and Standings

Races

Driver Points 
Below shows the top 100 in final points standings for 2017. 356 drivers in total attempted a World of Outlaws Craftsman Sprint Cars Series race in 2017.

Team Points

References

World of Outlaws Sprint Car seasons
World of Outlaws Sprint Car Series
World of Outlaws Sprint Car Series